The Hampshire Plate is an annual rugby union knock-out club competition organised by the Hampshire Rugby Football Union.  It was first introduced during the 1990–91 season, with the inaugural winners being Fareham Heathens.  It is the third most important rugby union cup competition in Hampshire, behind the Hampshire Cup and Hampshire Bowl.  The Plate was initially replaced by the Bowl competition for the 1999–00 season but was re-introduced for 2003–04.

The Hampshire Plate is currently open to club sides based in Hampshire, the Isle of Wight and the Channel Islands, who play between tier 9 (Hampshire Premier) and tier 11 (Hampshire 2) of the English rugby union league system, although teams from outside the league structure have also been invited to take part.  The format is a knockout cup with a preliminary round, quarter-finals, semi-finals and a final to be held at the home ground of one of the finalists between March–May.

Hampshire Plate winners

Number of wins
Fareham Heathens (4)
Farnborough (4)
Millbrook (3)
Southampton (2)
Eastleigh (1)
Esso Fawley (1)
Gosport & Fareham (1)
Jersey United Banks (1)
Petersfield (1)
Southampton Institute (1)
Southampton Solent University (1)
Southampton University Hospitals (1)
Southampton University Medics (1)
U.S. Portsmouth (1)
University of Southampton (1)
Ventnor (1)

Notes

See also
 Hampshire RFU
 Hampshire Cup
 Hampshire Bowl
 English rugby union system
 Rugby union in England

References

External links
 Hampshire RFU

Recurring sporting events established in 1990
1990 establishments in England
Rugby union cup competitions in England
Rugby union in Hampshire